The Ministry of Health of Peru is the government ministry in charge of healthcare. , the minister of Health is Rosa Gutiérrez.

History
Upon the commemoration of the 50th anniversary of the death of the Peruvian medical researcher Daniel Alcides Carrión, the government enacted the creation of the Ministry of Public Health, Works and Social Precaution. This ministry incorporated the previous Directory of Public Health and Social Precaution as well as the Directory of Indian Affairs of the Ministry of Foment. It additionally assumed the functions of the Department of Philanthropy which at the time belonged to the Ministry of Justice.

In 1942, the ministry changed its name to the Ministry of Public Health and Social Assistance, and in 1968 its name was again changed to the current Ministry of Health.

The first Minister of Health was Armando Montes de Peralta.

Mission
The Ministry of Health maintains the mission to protect the public dignity, to promote health, to prevent disease, and to guarantee healthcare to all inhabitants of the country. Additionally, it formulates public policy regarding sanitation.

External links
 

Health
Healthcare in Peru
Peru